Depot Glacier may refer to:

Depot Glacier (Antarctica)
Depot Glacier (Washington), in North Cascades National Park, Washington, USA